Single and Married is a 2012 Ghanaian Nigerian romantic blue comedy film, produced by Yvonne Nelson and directed by Pascal Amanfo. It stars Yvonne Nelson, Chris Attoh, Nadia Buari, Tana Adelana, Kofi Adjorlolo, Eddie Watson and Jane 'Efya' Awindor. The film "centres on the drama, the intrigue and the dirty little secrets of three male friends, their sex lives, being single or married, and all the in-betweens".

The film received ten nominations at the 2012 Ghana Movie Awards and won four awards at the event, including Best Picture, Best Directing (English Language), Best Actress in a Support Role (English), and Best Cinematography.

A sequel, Single, Married and Complicated, was released in 2014.

Plot
Jay (Chris Attoh), a casanova, to the surprise of his friends, proposes to his girlfriend, Kimora (Yvonne Nelson). Jay's friend, Raymond (Kweku Elliot) a casanova who's now also married to one of Kimora's friends, Paula (Nadia Buari), is indifferent. Andy (Eddie Watson), the "baddest" of the trio, thinks Jay is about to get into a lifetime imprisonment.

One year after the marriage, Jay is having an affair with Judith (Jane Awindor), and constantly lies to Kimora. Jay eventually breaks up with her, because she's become too possessive of him; on his way out of her apartment, Jay bumps into Raymond, who's also coming out of a mistress' apartment, thereby discovering each other's secrets. Apparently, Paula, a lawyer, is always busy with work and never finds time for Raymond, while Kimora has also refused to give Jay a blowjob. Paula introduces Raymond to Yolanda (Itz Tiffany), her old friend, and Raymond starts an affair with her as well.

Vida (Tana Adelana), a friend of Kimora and Paula, is married to Ranesh (Kofi Adjorlolo), a 59-year-old man who leaves her very unsatisfied in bed. She meets her new neighbor Andy, and eventually confesses that she wants to have sex with him, leading to them having an affair.

Judith turns out to be a friend of Kimora's, and she's come to stay with the couple for a month. Judith constantly taunts Jay in front of his wife. Jay speaks out of tune during an argument with Kimora, leading to him confessing his affairs, including the one with Judith. Paula realizes that she's had a very bad sex life with her husband, so she makes a sex timetable; infuriates Raymond and he asks for a divorce. During the divorce deliberation, Paula reveals that she knows about Raymond's affair with Yolanda, and that it was in fact a bet between her and Yolanda.

Kimora leaves Jay's house. Ranesh catches his wife and Andy having sex; Andy escapes by jumping down from the first storey of the building, breaking his leg as a result. Paula gets back together with her husband, having been convinced to do so by her counselor. Raymond apologizes about everything, while Paula asks sweetly how many times he'd want to have sex in a week. Kimora also sees a counselor, then  goes back to Jay and asks him to pull down his pants for a blowjob, but he refuses, overwhelmed by her presence. Andy is accosted by a lady who claims she's pregnant by him and tries to make a scene; Andy however cunningly escapes.

Cast
Yvonne Nelson as Kimora
Chris Attoh as Jay
Nadia Buari as Paula
Tana Adelana as Vida
Kofi Adjorlolo as Ranesh
Eddie Watson as Andy
Anita Erskin as Ruby
Kweku Elliot as Raymond
Jane Awindor as Judith
Lisa Raymond as Sandy
Michelle McKinney Hammond as Counselor
Itz Tiffany as Yolanda

Release
The film's trailer was released on YouTube on 25 July 2012, and currently has about ten million views, making it one of the most watched Nollywood trailers. It was released in Ghana on 22 September 2012, and premiered at the Silverbird Cinema, Victoria Island, Lagos on 28 September 2012.

Reception

Critical reception
The film has a 24% rating on Nollywood Reinvented, which criticized the story direction, and the actors' performances. It concluded by stating, "Cinematography was nearly nonexistent! Pascal Amanfo did not do a shabby job - It wasn’t that bad; [However], with a movie like this and a title like Single and Married, I think it’d be a bit far-fetched to watch this movie looking for an amazing storyline. If you go in seeking a magnanimous storyline or to be thrilled, sorry but you will be disappointed. So go in to watch people drive fancy cars, live in pretty houses and wear colourful clothes". The Ghanaian Chronicle gave a positive review, commenting: "The storyline raised serious issues about why spouses cheat on their partners and how to stop them. But it was told in a rather subtle, entertaining way. It is indeed a must-see movie".

Awards
Single and Married had ten nominations at the 2012 Ghana Movie Awards, including Best Actress in a Lead Role (English) for Nelson, Best Actor in a Supporting Role (English) for Attoh, Best Picture – African Collaboration, Best Editing, Best Art Direction and Best Music (Original Song). It eventually won Best Picture, Best Directing (English Language), Best Actress in a Support Role (English), and Best Cinematography.

References

External links

Ghanaian comedy films
Nigerian romantic comedy-drama films
2012 romantic comedy-drama films
2012 films
2012 comedy films
2012 drama films
English-language Ghanaian films
English-language Nigerian films
2010s English-language films